Wonbah is a rural locality in the Bundaberg Region, Queensland, Australia.

History 
In 1887,  of land were resumed from the Wonbah pastoral run. The land was offered for selection for the establishment of small farms on 17 April 1887.

Education 
There are no schools in Wonbah. The nearest primary school is in Mount Perry. The nearest secondary school is in Gin Gin.

References 

Bundaberg Region
Localities in Queensland